Huerta is a Spanish surname. Notable people with the surname include:

Artists
 Elena Huerta Muzquiz (1908–1997), Mexican artist
 Gaspar de la Huerta (1645–1714), Spanish artist
 Gerard Huerta (born 1952), American typographer and graphic designer
 Hugo Huerta Marin (born 1985), Mexican artist
 Jean de la Huerta (1413–1462), Spanish sculptor
 Salomón Huerta, Mexican-American painter

Entertainers
 Baldemar Garza Huerta (1937–2006), Mexican-American musician better known as Freddy Fender
 Clara Oriol de la Huerta (1884–1967), Mexican pianist
 Cris Huerta (1935–2004), Portuguese actor
 Jesse Eduardo Huerta Uecke (born 1982), member of the Mexican pop duo Jesse & Joy
 Jesús Alfonso Huerta Escoboza (1966–2020), Mexican wrestler better known as La Parka II
 Paz de la Huerta (born 1984), Spanish-American actress and model
 Rodolfo Guzmán Huerta (1917–1984), a Mexican wrestler and actor better known as El Santo
 Tenoch Huerta (born 1981), Mexican actor
 Tirzah Joy Huerta Uecke (born 1986), member of the Mexican pop duo Jesse & Joy

Politicians
 Adolfo de la Huerta (1881–1955), President of Mexico
 Aníbal Huerta, Peruvian politician
 Arsenio Lope Huerta (1943–2021), Spanish writer and politician
 Eleazar Huerta Valcárcel (1903–1974), Spanish poet and politician
 Fernando Bustamante Huerta (born 1940), Chilean politician
 José Huerta (1948–2019), Peruvian politician
 Juan Huerta Montero (1964–2010), Mexican politician
 Lorena Ruiz-Huerta (born 1977), Spanish politician
 Manuel Rafael Huerta (born 1960), Mexican politician
 María de Jesús Huerta (born 1951), Mexican politician
 Mario Miguel Carrillo Huerta (born 1947), Mexican politician
 Mauro Huerta Díaz (born 1967), Mexican politician
 Miguel Barbosa Huerta (born 1959), Mexican politician
 Ramón Martín Huerta (1957–2005), Mexican politician
 Roberto Huerta (1917–2003), Argentinian politician
 Víctor Ernesto González Huerta (born 1964), Mexican politician
 Victoriano Huerta (1850–1916), President of Mexico

Sportspeople

American football
 Carlos Huerta (born 1969), American football player
 Marcelino Huerta (1924–1985), American football player and coach

Association football
 Alan Huerta (born 1995), American football player
 César Huerta (born 2000), Mexican football player
 Édgar Huerta (born 1997), Mexican football player
 Felipe Sanchón Huerta (born 1982), Spanish football player
 Guillermo Huerta (born 1966), Mexican football player and manager
 Gustavo Huerta (born 1957), Chilean football player and manager
 Jaime Huerta (born 1987), Peruvian football player
 Juan Huerta (born 1980), Argentinian football player
 Mario Sanchez Huerta, Mexican football player
 Osmán Huerta (born 1989), Chilean football player
 Sofia Huerta (born 1992), American football player 
 Ulises Jaimes Huerta (born 1996), Mexican football player
 Valber Huerta (born 1993), Chilean football player

Boxing
 Charles Huerta (born 1986), American boxer
 Miguel Ángel Huerta (born 1978), Mexican boxer

Rowing
 Fernando Climent Huerta (born 1958), Spanish rower
 Gabriela Huerta (born 1983), Mexican rower
 Jesús Huerta (born 1980), Mexican rower

Other sports
 Arturo Huerta (born 1964), Canadian race walker
 Francisco Huerta (born 1947), Mexican cyclist
 Irma Huerta (born 1969), Mexican freestyle swimmer
 Manuel Huerta (born 1984), Cuban triathlete
 Mayra Huerta (born 1970), Mexican beach volleyball player 
 Roger Huerta (born 1983), American mixed martial arts fighter

Writers
 Christian de la Huerta, Cuban-American writer
 David Huerta (born 1949), Mexican poet
 Efraín Huerta (1914–1982), Mexican poet and journalist
 Javier O. Huerta, Mexican-American poet
 Jorge Huerta (born 1942), American author and theatre director
 Màxim Huerta (born 1971), Spanish writer and journalist
 Vincent Garcia de la Huerta (1734–1787), Spanish writer and poet
 Vicente Antonio García de la Huerta (1734–1787), Spanish dramatist

Others
 Alvaro Huerta, American academic
 Carlos de la Torre Huerta (1858–1950), Cuban naturalist
 Dolores Huerta (born 1930), Mexican-American union leader
 Elmer Huerta (born 1952), Peruvian physician
 Esteban Huertas López (1876–1943), Colombian and Panamanian military commander
 Felix Huerta ( 1859–1892), Spanish friar
 Guadalupe Huerta (1920–2000), American activist
 Héctor Huerta Ríos (died 2019), Mexican drug lord
 Ismael Huerta (1916–1997), Chilean admiral
 Jesús Huerta de Soto (born 1956), Spanish economist
 Marina Huerta (born 1968), Argentinian physicist
 Michael Huerta (born 1956), American government official
 Salvador Flores Huerta (1934–2018), Mexican bishop

See also
 Huerta (disambiguation)
 Huertas (surname)

Spanish-language surnames
Sephardic surnames